Arlington station can refer to:

Railway stations
Arlington station (Lexington Branch), a former commuter rail station in Arlington, Massachusetts
Arlington station (MBTA), a subway station in Boston
Arlington MLR station, a light rail station in Sydney
Arlington station (NJ Transit), a former commuter rail station in New Jersey
Arlington station (PAAC), a light rail station near Pittsburgh, Pennsylvania
Arlington station (Staten Island Railway), a former rapid transit station in New York 
Arlington Cemetery station, a Washington Metro station in Arlington, Virginia
Arlington Heights station (MBTA), a former commuter rail station in Arlington, Massachusetts
Arlington Heights station, a commuter rail station in Arlington Heights, Illinois
Arlington Park station, a commuter rail station in Arlington Heights, Illinois
Arlington Station, California, a former railway station and community in California
Mount Arlington station, a commuter rail station in New Jersey
West Arlington station, a former commuter rail station in New Jersey

Other
Arlington Hall (known as Arlington Hall Station), a former school and intelligence headquarters in Arlington, Virginia
Arlington Pumping Station, a water pumping station

See also
Arlington (disambiguation)